Khan Ahmad Khan Ardalan was the Ardalan beglerbeg (governor) of Kurdistan from 1617/18 to 1637. Before his tenure, he lived as a hostage at the royal court in Isfahan, where he spent his adolescence. There he reinforced the bond between the Safavids and Kurds by marrying Zarrin Kolah, a daughter of Shah Abbas I. In 1617/18, Shah Abbas I dismissed Khan Ahmad Khan's father Halow Khan Ardalan as the governor of Kurdistan and had him sent to Isfahan, where he died in 1627/28. Khan Ahmad Khan was sent to Ardalan in his stead. In 1633, Khan Ahmad Khan rebelled after his two sons were blinded by Shah Safi. Khan Ahmad Khan was defeated in 1637 and died in the same year. He was replaced by his cousin Soleyman Khan Ardalan.

References

Sources 
 
 
 

Ardalan
Year of birth unknown
1637 deaths
17th-century people of Safavid Iran
17th-century Kurdish people
Safavid governors of Kurdistan
Rebellions against Safavid Iran